Glyptopetalum zeylanicum is a tree species in the family Celastraceae native to Peninsular India and Sri Lanka. The specific epithet  refers to the species being native to the island of Sri Lanka.

Description
Its branches are slender and pubescent.

References
Notes

Biibliography
India Biodiversity
Jstor.org

Glyptopetalum
Flora of Sri Lanka
Plants described in 1856